The National Institutional Ranking Framework (NIRF) is a methodology adopted by the Ministry of Education, Government of India, to rank institutions of higher education in India. The Framework was approved by the MHRD and launched by Minister of Human Resource Development on 29 September 2015. Depending on their areas of operation,  institutions have been ranked under 11 different categories – overall, university, colleges, engineering, management, pharmacy, law, medical, architecture, dental and research. The Framework uses several parameters for ranking purposes like resources, research, and stakeholder perception. These parameters have been grouped into five clusters and these clusters were assigned certain weightages. The weightages depend on the type of institution. About 3500 institutions voluntarily participated in the first round of rankings.

The rankings have been heavily criticized as an attempt to manipulate students, companies and general public. In spite of various flaws and subjectivities, government has refused to modify the methodologies or results of the rankings.

Background 

The 2017 ranked lists were released by MHRD on 3 April 2017. While in its first rankings released in 2016, NIRF had four categories (Universities, Engineering, Management and Pharmacy), in 2017, two more categories namely, Overall and College, were added. Around 3,000 institutions participated in the rankings.

On April 3, 2018, the 2018 NIRF rankings were released which witnessed an increase in the number of participating institutions.

The NIRF ranking for 2019 was released on April 8, 2019 in 9 categories which included Overall, Universities, Engineering, Colleges, Management, Pharmacy, Medical, Architecture, and Law.

For the 2020 rankings, around 3,800 institutions participated in the process, which was 20 percent more than that in 2019. The 2020 ranked lists were released by MHRD on June 11, 2020. For the first time, the Dental institutes were placed under a different ranking list.

Formation

MHRD organized a one-day workshop on 21 August 2014 on evolving methodologies for the ranking of institutions of higher education in India. The meeting resolved to constitute a Committee for evolving a National Ranking Framework. Later it was also decided to co-opt representatives of central universities and IIMs also into the proposed committee. Based on these decisions, a core committee consisting of 16 members was constituted on 29 October 2014 with secretary (HE, MHRD, as chairperson and additional secretary (TE), MHRD, as member-secretary. The other members were the vice-chancellors of Delhi University, EFL University, Central University of Gujarat and JNU, the directors of the IIT Kharagpur, IIT Madras, IIM Ahmedabad, IIM Bangalore, NIT Tiruchirappalli, NIT Warangal, IIIT&M Gwalior, IISER Bhopal, SPA Delhi, NAAC, and chairperson of  NBA.

The terms of reference of the committee were:
Suggest  a  National  Framework  for  performance  measurement  and  ranking of 
Institutions;
Programmes;
Suggest the organizational  structure, institutional mechanism and processes for implementation along with time-lines of the National Ranking Framework.
 Suggest a mechanism for financing of the Scheme on National Ranking Framework.
Suggest linkages with National Assessment and Accreditation Council (NAAC) and National Board of Accreditation (NBA), if any.

The core committee identified a set of measurable parameters to be used as metrics for ranking the institutions. These parameters were grouped into five major headings. The committee suggested the weightages to be assigned to various groups of parameters in the case of institutions of engineering education and left the task of carrying out similar exercises for institutions of other disciplines to other competent agencies. The initial draft of the report was prepared by Surendra Prasad, chairman, National Board of Accreditation and 
Member of the core committee.

The University Grants Commission constituted an expert committee on 9 October 2015 to develop a framework for the ranking of universities and colleges in India and the framework developed by this expert committee has been incorporated into NIRF. The core committee also suggested a framework for ranking institutions offering management education also. The All India Council for Technical Education developed parameters and metrics for ranking institutions offering pharmacy education and also architecture education.

Recommendations of the core committee
The following are some of the recommendations of the core committee:

The  metrics  for  ranking  of  engineering institutions should be based on the parameters agreed upon by the core committee.
 The parameters have been organized into five broad heads or groups and each group has been divided into suitable sub-groups. Each broad head has an overall weight assigned to it. Within each head, the sub-heads should also have appropriate weight distributions.
A suitable metric has been proposed which computes a score under each sub-head.  The sub-head scores are then added to obtain scores for each individual head. The overall score is computed-based on the weights allotted to each head. The overall score can take a maximum value of 100.
The committee recommended the classification of institutions into two categories:
Category A institutions: These are institutions of national importance set up by Acts of Parliament, State Universities, Deemed-to-be Universities, Private Universities and other autonomous institutions. 
Category B institutions: These are institutions affiliated to a University and do not enjoy full academic autonomy.

Parameters and their weightages

Engineering, management, pharmacy and architecture institutions

The approved set of parameter groups and the weightages assigned to them in respect of institutions offering programmes in engineering, management, pharmacy and architecture are given in the following table.

Overall and colleges
The approved set of parameter groups and the weightages assigned to them in respect of overall rating and for colleges are given in the following table, for 2018.

Criticism

The list was criticised for being incomplete, incoherent and bordering on the random in 2017.
Indian Institute of Technology (BHU) Varanasi raised objection on 2017 NIRF ranking, accusing it of being based on incomplete data.

In 2021, Professor Anil Kumar Tripathi, director of the Institute of Science, Banaras Hindu University criticised the NIRF University rankings, accusing it to compare institutions with same budget but varying number of students. He said that "IISc  no doubt, is the top institution in the country. Banaras Hindu University (BHU), however, is a different kind of educational institution. Both institutions have almost the same budget but the same amount of money caters to a large number of students, teachers and infrastructure at BHU. In comparison to IISc the money available is about five to ten times lesser in our university because of the sheer size".

See also 

 National Skill Development Agency
 National Education Policy 2020
 Skill India

References
 NIRF Ranking 2020-Top 10 University list IISc, JNU, and BHU Best Universities 
 

University and college rankings
Modi administration initiatives